Design flows are the explicit combination of electronic design automation tools to accomplish the design of an integrated circuit.  Moore's law has driven the entire IC implementation RTL to GDSII design flows from one which uses primarily stand-alone synthesis, placement, and routing algorithms to an integrated construction and analysis flows for design closure.  The challenges of rising interconnect delay led to a new way of thinking about and integrating design closure tools.

The RTL to GDSII flow underwent significant changes from 1980 through 2005. The continued scaling of CMOS technologies significantly changed the objectives of the various design steps. The lack of good predictors for delay has led to significant changes in recent design flows. New scaling challenges such as leakage power,
variability, and reliability will continue to require significant changes to the design closure process in the future.  Many factors describe what drove the design flow from a set of separate design steps to a fully integrated approach, and what further changes are coming to address the latest challenges. In his keynote at the 40th Design Automation Conference entitled The Tides of EDA, Alberto Sangiovanni-Vincentelli distinguished three periods of EDA:
 The Age of Invention: During the invention era, routing, placement, static timing analysis and logic synthesis were invented. 
 The Age of Implementation: In the age of implementation, these steps were drastically improved by designing sophisticated data structures and advanced algorithms. This allowed the tools in each of these design steps to keep pace with the rapidly increasing design sizes. However, due to the lack of good predictive cost functions, it became impossible to execute a design flow by a set of discrete steps, no matter how efficiently  each of the steps was implemented. 
 The Age of Integration: This led to the age of integration where most of the design steps are performed in an integrated environment, driven by a set of incremental cost analyzers.

There are differences between the steps and methods of the design flow for analog and digital integrated circuits. Nonetheless, a typical VLSI design flow consists of various steps like design conceptualization, chip optimization, logical/physical implementation, and design validation and verification.

See also 
 Placement (EDA), an essential step in Electronic Design Automation (EDA)
 Routing (EDA), a crucial step in the design of integrated circuits
 Power optimization (EDA), the use of EDA tools to optimize (reduce) the power consumption of a digital design, while preserving its functionality
 Post-silicon validation, the final step in the EDA design flow

References 

 Electronic Design Automation For Integrated Circuits Handbook, by Lavagno, Martin, and Scheffer,  – A survey of the field, from which this summary was derived, with permission.

Digital electronics
Electronic design automation
Electronics optimization